Return is a 2018 South Korean television series. It aired from January 17 to March 22, 2018, on SBS TV's Wednesdays and Thursdays at 22:00 (KST) time slot for 34 episodes.

Synopsis
A body is found on the freeway, and the four suspects are South Korea's powerful elites. Choi Ja-hye, the most influential and famous female lawyer in the country, decides to take the case and defend Kang In-ho, per the request of her law school friend Geum Na-ra. However, In-ho was having an affair with the victim and was seen having an argument with her the day before the murder took place. As Ja-hye investigates the case with Dokgo Young, a detective with a dark past as a juvenile criminal, they realize that the case is not a simple murder but was born out of corruption and dark secrets among In-ho and his friends.

Cast

Main
 Go Hyun-jung/Park Jin-hee as Choi Ja-hye
 A lawyer who is now the host of a legal-themed TV show titled Return. She helps Na-ra to solve In-ho's trial. 
 Lee Jin-wook as Dokgo Young
 A hot-tempered detective. He has a sharp analytical to follow the trail of a murder case. Throughout the series, he manages to solve the murder cases, but is unable to capture the socialites throughout the years for their wrongdoings.
 Shin Sung-rok as Oh Tae-seok
 A calm and successful CEO of an IT company, but turns to have shady behavior when he attempts to cover up a mistake he or Hak-beom makes. He is currently being framed for murdering Ahn Hak-soo, a former police officer whom owns a karaoke bar. After Tae-seok's and Hak-beom's secret is revealed, he plans to silence anyone who gets in his way, especially Attorney Choi. 
 Bong Tae-gyu as Kim Hak-beom
 A professor in theology studies at Myungsung Foundation. He turns out to be an impulsive and abusive man who resorts to violence without thinking of its consequences. When things do not go on his ways, he tends to displace his anger onto other characters or bribe them with money in the show.
 Park Ki-woong as Kang In-ho
 The chief director at Taeha Corporation. He was in a relationship with Mi-jung during their younger times. After marrying Na-ra, he had an adulterous affair with Mi-jung for one year and became the co-founder of Mi-jung's wine bar. When Mi-jung was found murdered, he was framed and put into prison. Despite being bribed by his wife, Na-ra, their marriage become more estrange and his attempts to save the marriage becomes futile due to his wife's discovery of his affair with Mi-jung. Throughout the series, he was the one whom knocked down a little girl when he was in high school. Unfortunately, he reluctantly followed Mi-jung's and the rest of his friends' suggestion to throw the girl into the sea. 
 Jung Eun-chae as Geum Na-ra
 In-ho's wife and a former lawyer who passed her bar examination. Mi-jung describes her as an innocent, devoted and beautiful wife of In-ho. After Mi-jung was murdered, she discovered In-ho's affair. Currently, she has an estranged relationship with In-ho.
 Yoon Jong-hoon as Seo Jun-hee
 Ji Min-hyuk as young Jun-hee
 A doctor and an associate with Tae-seok, Hak-beom and In-ho. Due to regrets and guilt he has gone through, he succumbed into drug addiction for years to forget the incident as well as stresses in workplace. When he witnessed Mi-jung's death and became his friends' accomplices, he decided to turn himself to the police. However, he was nearly murdered by both Tae-seok and Hak-beom. Despite running away from his mistakes and his friends, Na-ra managed to convince him to turn himself to the police, together with the evidences he had in the USB.

Supporting
 Oh Dae-hwan as Kim Jung-soo
 A doctor at The Daemyung Hospital. 
 Kim Hee-jung as Kang Young-eun
 Attorney Choi's assistant attorney. She is a very observant and calm character. She helps both Choi and Na-ra to find Joon-hee in a hospital in Taein.
 Kim Dong-young as Kim Dong-bae
 A detective working with Dokgo Young. He saved Jun-hee from car crash. He turns out to have an alliance with Ja-hye to expose Taek-seok and the rest of the socialites' corruptions.
 Seo Hye-rin as Ko Seok-soon
 Son Jong-hak as An Hak-soo
 A corrupted police, who used to be Detective Young's superior. He was the police-in-charge of the Sung Jung-mi's drowning case in 1999. 
 Yoon Joo-hee as Park Jin-joo
 Shin Rin-ah as Kang Dal-rae
 In-ho's and Na-ra's quiet and introverted daughter.
 Jung Ji-yoon as Ms. Kyung

Special appearances
 Han Eun-jung as Yeom Mi-jung/Rachel Yeom (Ep. 1–2)
 The victim of In-ho's case. She owned a wine bar, sponsored by In-ho. She had an affair with him for a year. After aborting his child, she planned to ruin In-ho's family by getting close to Na-ra.
 Park Jun-gyu as Park Byung-ho
 Shin Yoo-ram as a drug trafficker
 Jung Han-hun as Seo Joon-hee's father
 Kim Hyung-mok as Kim Byung-ki
  A car salesperson, who was murdered by Tae-seok
 Kang Nam-gil as a judge
 Jo Seung-yeon as a prosecutor
 Hong Ji-yoon as Bang Seon-yeong
 Kim Myung-su as Judge Lim Woo-jae
 Kang Seong-min as a foreign car dealer
 Ahn Hye-kyung as a client
 Lee Kye-in

Production
The first script reading of the cast was held on November 15, 2017.

Controversy
On February 7, 2018, it was reported that there was a large dispute on set of the series on the 5th, between lead actress Go Hyun-jung and the series' director Joo Dong-min. The following day, Go's agency officially announced that the actress would be leaving the team due to irreconcilable differences with the directing team concerning the production process. The agency also denied the initial reports that her sudden departure was due to her physically assaulting director Joo; stating that "there was indeed a verbal conflict but reports of physical assault was nonsensical". Meanwhile, viewers of the series flooded SBS website with comments blaming the producer for "abusing his power" and calling for director Joo to quit instead.

Actress Park Jin-hee later replaced Go Hyun-jung for the role of Choi Ja-hye. She started filming on February 13 and first appeared on the sixteenth episode.

Original soundtrack

Part 1

Part 2

Part 3

Ratings

Awards and nominations

Notes

References

External links
  
 
 

Seoul Broadcasting System television dramas
Korean-language television shows
2018 South Korean television series debuts
South Korean thriller television series
South Korean mystery television series
South Korean legal television series
2018 South Korean television series endings
Television series by Studio S